An early adopter or lighthouse customer is an early customer of a given company, product, or technology. The term originates from Everett M. Rogers' Diffusion of Innovations (1962).

History
Typically, early adopters are customers who, in addition to using the vendor's product or technology, also provide considerable and candid feedback to help the vendor refine its future product releases, as well as the associated means of distribution, service, and support. Early adoption could also be referred to as a form of testing in the early stages of a project. 

The relationship is synergistic. The customer receives early (and sometimes unique, or at least uniquely early) access to an advantageous new product or technology. In return, the customer may also serve as a kind of guinea pig.

In exchange for being an early adopter, and thus being exposed to the problems, risks, and annoyances common to early-stage product testing and deployment, the "lighthouse customer" is sometimes given especially attentive vendor assistance and support, even to the point of having personnel at the customer's work site to assist with implementation. The customer is sometimes given preferential pricing, terms, and conditions, although new technology is often very expensive, so the early adopter still often pays quite a lot.

The vendor, on the other hand, benefits from receiving early revenues, and also from a lighthouse customer's endorsement and assistance in further developing the product and its go-to-market mechanisms. Acquiring lighthouse customers is a common step in new product development and implementation. The real-world focus that this type  of relationship can bring to a vendor can be extremely valuable.

Early adoption does come with pitfalls: early versions of products may be buggy and/or prone to malfunction.  Furthermore, more efficient, and sometimes less expensive, versions of the product usually appear a few months after the initial release (Apple iPhone).  The trend of new technology costing more at release is often referred to as the "early adopter tax".

See also

 Alpha consumer
 Beta test
 Coolhunting
 Crossing the Chasm
 Diffusion (business)
 Diffusion of innovations
 Dominance (economics)
 Eating your own dog food
 Eric von Hippel
 Experimental techniques
 Focus group
 Hipsters
 Innovation
 Lead user
 Learning-by-doing (economics)
 Marketing
 Observational techniques
 Participatory design
 Product lifecycle management
 Qualitative marketing research
 Quantitative marketing research
 Technology adoption lifecycle
 Toolkits for user innovation
 User innovation
 Empathic design
 Whole Product

References

zh-yue:早期客

Diffusion
Innovation economics
Innovation
Product development
Memetics
Science and technology studies
Stage theories
Sociology of culture
Technological change